The 2020–21 Arkansas Razorbacks men's basketball team represented the University of Arkansas during the 2020–21 NCAA Division I men's basketball season. The team was led by second-year head coach Eric Musselman, and played their home games at Bud Walton Arena in Fayetteville, Arkansas as a member of the Southeastern Conference. The Razorbacks finished second in the SEC regular season and earned a 3 seed in the NCAA Tournament's South Regional. Arkansas went on to make it to the Sweet Sixteen of the NCAA Tournament for the first time since the 1995–96 season, and then to the Elite Eight for the first time since the 1994–95 season. Freshman guard Moses Moody was named the SEC Freshman of the Year, 1st Team All-SEC, Freshman All-American, and AP Honorable Mention All-American. The Razorbacks finished the season with an overall record of 25–7, 13–4 in SEC play, and finished ranked #6 in the Coaches Poll and #10 in the AP Poll. Arkansas's season ended when they lost to eventual national champion Baylor in the Elite Eight.

The Razorbacks cruised through a pandemic-shortened non-conference slate that originally featured a neutral site matchup against Oklahoma in Tulsa, Oklahoma and a bid to the MGM Resorts Main Event tournament in Las Vegas, Nevada. The non-conference schedule included a game against an in-state program, the University of Central Arkansas, for the first time since a match against Arkansas State in the 1987 NIT and the first time in the regular season since playing Arkansas Tech in 1950. The Razorbacks also defeated their eventual Sweet Sixteen opponent, Oral Roberts, in a non-conference game in Bud Walton Arena. Owning an 8–0 record heading into conference play, Arkansas started its SEC regular season with a road win against Auburn, but lost starter Justin Smith to an ankle injury that sidelined or limited him for the first third of conference play, which contributed to Arkansas getting off to a rough 2–4 start against SEC competition, including consecutive blowout losses on the road to LSU and Alabama.

After the losses to LSU and Alabama, which were sandwiched around the toughest practice of the Musselman era, the Razorbacks turned their season around and did not lose another regular season SEC game, winning eleven straight conference matchups and eleven out of their last twelve overall in the regular season, with the lone loss coming on the road against Oklahoma State. The conference winning streak included three wins against teams that beat the Razorbacks earlier in the season, two top-ten wins, and the Razorbacks' first top-ten road win since 2006. Arkansas became ranked for the first time since 2018 on February 15, 2021. The Razorbacks followed that up by being ranked in consecutive polls for the first time since 2015, then hosted their first ranked matchup in Fayetteville since 1998 when #6 Alabama came to town with a chance to clinch the SEC regular season championship before losing to Arkansas 81–66.

After winning every game in the month of February, the Razorbacks were ranked #12 before closing out the regular season in second place for the SEC title with a 13–4 conference record, their highest finish in league play since the 2014–15 season and as high as they had finished since winning the conference and national titles in 1994. Arkansas entered the 2021 SEC men's basketball tournament ranked #8, the team's highest ranking since the 1994–95 season. After beating Missouri in the quarterfinals and losing to LSU in the semifinals, the Razorbacks earned a 3 seed for the NCAA tournament, their highest seed since the 1994–95 season.

Arkansas advanced to the Elite Eight after victories against Colgate, Texas Tech, and Oral Roberts. Arkansas had not made a Sweet Sixteen appearance since 1996 and had not made it to the Elite Eight since 1995. The Hogs lost to eventual national champion Baylor in the Elite Eight. The Razorbacks finished the season ranked #10 in the AP Poll and #6 in the Coaches Poll; it was their first top-ten finish since 1995.

Senior guard Jalen Tate was named to the All-South Region team after his performance in the NCAA Tournament. Freshman guard Moses Moody was voted AP Honorable Mention All-American, 1st Team All-SEC, SEC Freshman of the Year, and SEC All-Freshman. Junior guard JD Notae was named SEC Sixth Man of the Year.

Previous season
The Razorbacks finished the 2019–20 season with a record of 20–12, 7–11 in SEC play to finish in a tie for 10th place. Junior Mason Jones won a share of the SEC Player of the Year award and was named a consensus First-Team All-SEC player.

Arkansas started the season strong, going into conference play with an 11–1 record, including two road wins against Power Five teams, Georgia Tech and Indiana.

After winning their first-round game against Vanderbilt on March 11, 2020, the Hogs were slated for a rematch against South Carolina in the second round, but the SEC announced on March 12, 2020 that the SEC Tournament was cancelled due to the COVID-19 pandemic, with an announcement following from the NCAA later that day that the whole tournament was cancelled, along with all other winter and spring championships, ending the Razorbacks' season.

They finished with 20 wins against 12 losses in coach Eric Musselman's first season. He was the first coach to win 20 games in his initial campaign at Arkansas since John Pelphrey won 23 in the 2007–08 season.

Offseason
On August 1, 2020, star guard Isaiah Joe announced that he was withdrawing his name from the 2020 NBA draft and returning for his junior season. Joe was a member of the 2019 SEC All-Freshman Team and earned preseason All-SEC recognition prior to his sophomore season, before going on to lead the league in three-pointers made, rank fourth in the NCAA for three-pointers made per game, as well as being named SEC Player of the Week on December 30, 2019 before having knee surgery on February 4, 2020, which sidelined him for six games. Joe would have highlighted a group of three returnees with starting experience for the Hogs, but on August 17, 2020, sixteen days after his initial announcement, Joe reversed his decision and opted to declare for the 2020 NBA draft.

Departures

Incoming Transfers

2020 recruiting class

2021 Recruiting class

Roster

Schedule and results

|-
!colspan=12 style=|Regular season

|-
!colspan=12 style=|  SEC Tournament

|-
!colspan=12 style=|  NCAA Tournament

See also
2020–21 Arkansas Razorbacks women's basketball team

References

Arkansas Razorbacks
Arkansas Razorbacks men's basketball seasons
Arkansas